Randi is the feminine form of Randy, a given name.  		  	
  	
Randi may also refer to:
Randi (surname), a list of people with the surname
3163 Randi, an asteroid named after James Randi
The Amazing Randi, stage name of magician James Randi

See also
Randy (disambiguation)